Carlos Aragonés Espinoza (born 16 February 1956), nicknamed "Aragonez" in Brazil, is a former Bolivian football (soccer) midfielder, who is Bolivia national team's third-placed all-time goalscorer. He played for several top-level clubs of Bolivia and Brazil. Aragonés was the Bolivia national team head coach in 2001. The last team he managed at club level was Blooming until February 2011.

Playing career

Club
Born in Santa Cruz de la Sierra, he started his career in 1976, defending Bolívar, where he was part of the squad that won the Bolivian league in 1976 and in 1978, Aragonés moved to Brazil in 1981 to play for Palmeiras. He stayed in the club until 1984, playing 113 games before leaving. Carlos Aragonés moved to Coritiba in 1984, playing six more Série A games without scoring a goal. He returned to Bolivia in 1985 and joined Destroyers. While playing for the canarios, he suffered a serious knee injury that put an end to his football career.

International
He played 31 games for the Bolivia national team between 1977 and 1981, scoring 15 goals, including two against Brazil in the Copa América 1979. He is the third-placed Bolivia national team's all-time goalscorer. He represented his country in 12 FIFA World Cup qualification matches.

Managerial career
Carlos Aragonés was hired as the Bolivia national team manager in 2000, but he resigned after the unsuccessful campaign at the Copa América 2001.

At club level he has managed Bolivian clubs Real Santa Cruz, The Strongest, Blooming, Oriente Petrolero and Bolívar.

Between 2006 and 2009, Aragonés was Erwin Sánchez's coaching staff coordinator for the Bolivia national team.

Honours

Player

Club
Club Independiente
 Bolívar
club palmeiras brasil 
Liga de Fútbol Profesional Boliviano: 1978

Manager

Club
 The Strongest
Liga de Fútbol Profesional Boliviano: 1993

 Blooming
Liga de Fútbol Profesional Boliviano: 1998, 1999

References

External links
  Club Bolívar all-time topscorers 

1956 births
Living people
Sportspeople from Santa Cruz de la Sierra
Association football midfielders
Bolivian footballers
Bolivia international footballers
Club Bolívar players
Sociedade Esportiva Palmeiras players
Coritiba Foot Ball Club players
Club Destroyers players
Bolivian expatriate footballers
Expatriate footballers in Brazil
Bolivian expatriate sportspeople in Brazil
1979 Copa América players
2001 Copa América managers
Bolivian football managers
The Strongest managers
Club Blooming managers
Oriente Petrolero managers
Club Bolívar managers
Bolivia national football team managers